Four cities made the shortlist with their bids to host the 2002 Winter Olympics (formally known as XIX Olympic Winter Games), which were awarded to Salt Lake City, Utah, United States, on June 16, 1995. The other cities shortlisted by the IOC Selection Committee chaired by Thomas Bach were Sion, Switzerland; Östersund, Sweden; and Quebec City, Quebec, Canada. The host city selection procedure to for the 2002 Winter Olympics faced a scandal regarding the interactions between the Salt Lake City bid team and International Olympic Committee (IOC) members; ten IOC members resigned as a result, as did Salt Lake City bid leaders Tom Welch and Dave Johnson.  Nevertheless, Salt Lake City overwhelmingly won the right to host the Games, needing only one round to gain the absolute majority of the votes.

Nevertheless, from sporting and business standpoints, this was one of the most successful Winter Olympic Games in history; records were set in both the broadcasting and marketing programs. Over 2 billion viewers watched more than 13 billion viewer-hours. The Games were also financially successful raising more money with fewer sponsors than any prior Olympic Games, which left SLOC with a surplus of $40 million. The surplus was used to create the Utah Athletic Foundation, which maintains and operates many of the remaining Olympic venues.

Final selection

Cities not shortlisted
  Graz
  Jaca
  Poprad
  Sochi (would later host the 2014 Winter Olympics).
  Tarvisio

Candidature files
 Jaca 2002
 Sion 2002 Volume 1
 Sion 2002 Volume 2
 Sion 2002 Volume 3
 Östersund 2002 Volume 1
 Östersund 2002 Volume 2
 Östersund 2002 Volume 3
 Quebec City 2002 Volume 1
 Quebec City 2002 Volume 2
 Quebec City 2002 Volume 3

See also
 2002 Winter Olympic bid scandal

References

Bids
 
June 1995 events in Europe
1990s in Budapest
Events in Budapest
1995 in Hungary